Republican Football Club Akhmat, commonly known as Akhmat Grozny, is a Russian professional football club based in Grozny that plays in the Russian Premier League. The team was named Terek between 1958 and 2017.

History
It was founded in 1946, as Dynamo; it changed its name in 1948 to Neftyanik and in 1958 to Terek, it changed the name again in 2017 to Akhmat. The club is named after Akhmat Kadyrov.

In the 1990s the club was disbanded for some time due to the war in Chechnya. From the 1990s to 2007 the club played its home games in the neighbouring resort city of Pyatigorsk, Stavropol Krai. Before the start of the 2008 Premier League season, the Russian Football Union granted Terek the right to host Premier League matches in Grozny.

They won the Russian Cup by beating Krylya Sovetov Samara in the final and the Russian First Division in 2004. In 2004 they advanced through the UEFA Cup qualification by beating the Polish team Lech Poznań 1–0 in both legs but lost to Swiss outfit FC Basel in the first round. They played in the Russian Premier League in 2005 but were relegated after finishing last. Terek finished second in the First Division in 2007 and were promoted back into the Premier League.

On 3 July 2008, Terek signed three Romanian players at once: Andrei Margaritescu (Dinamo București), Florentin Petre (CSKA Sofia) and Daniel Pancu (Rapid București). Terek finished 12th in the 2010 Russian Premier League season.

A new stadium has been built for the club.

Cameroonian FC Lotus-Terek Yaoundé, founded by Terek player Guy Stephane Essame and coached by Thomas Libiih, is a farm team of the Russian club.

In January 2011 the club signed former Dutch international Ruud Gullit to an 18-month contract to manage the club. On 14 June 2011 Gullit was sacked for poor results.

On 7 June 2017, the team was renamed from FC Terek to FC Akhmat, after Akhmad Kadyrov, former President of the Chechen Republic.

On 30 October 2017, manager Oleg Kononov resigned, with Mikhail Galaktionov taking over in a caretaker capacity, before being announced as Akhmat's permanent manager on 14 December 2017.

On 30 September 2019, after a 2–0 away defeat to Sochi, Rashid Rakhimov resigned as manager, with Igor Shalimov being appointed as Rakhimov's replacement the same day. On 26 July 2020, Igor Shalimov's contract as manager expired and he left Akhmat Grozny, to be replaced by Andrei Talalayev.

On 11 September 2022, Andrei Talalayev was relieved of his duties as Head Coach, with Yury Nagaytsev taking over in a caretaker capacity. On 22 September 2022, Sergei Tashuyev was announced as Akhmat Grozny's new permanent Head Coach.

League

USSR

Russia

European

Stadium

Between the 1990s and the 2007 Season, Akhmat Grozny played their home games at the Central Stadium in the neighbouring resort city of Pyatigorsk in Stavropol Krai. At the start of the 2008 season they moved to the Sultan Bilimkhanov Stadium, playing their home games there until the opening of Akhmat-Arena on 20 May 2011, when they beat Anzhi Makhachkala 1–0 in the Russian Premier League.

Players

Other players under contract

Out on loan

Terek-2 Grozny
In 2013, a professional farm club called FC Terek-2 Grozny was created. It played in the third-tier Russian Professional Football League until they were dissolved after the 2015–16 season.

Honours
Russian Cup
Champions (1): 2003–04

Russian Super Cup
Runners-up (1): 2005

Club officials

Management
{| class="wikitable"
|-
|Manager
| Sergei Tashuyev
|-
|Assistant manager
| Yevgeni Knyazhev
|-
|Assistant manager
| Sergio Giovani
|-
|Goalkeeping coach
| Ramzan Tsutsulayev
|-
|Doctor
|  Magomedtagir Sugaipov
|-
|Team director
| Ruslan Serbiyev

Managerial history

 Fyodorov 1968
 Smirnov 1969
 Zagretsky 1969
 Morozov 1971
 Belousov 1972 to 73
 Dudayev 1976 to 77
 Frolov 1979
 Kirichenko 1979
 Yeskov 1981
 Mikheyev 1982
 L. Shevchenko 1984 to 85
 Dyachenko 1989 to 90
 Adiyev 1990
 Tarkhanov 1991
 Alkhanov 1992 to 93
 Mikheyev 1994
 Diniyev 2001
 Dzaitiyevc 2001
 Platonov 2002
 Mikheyevc 2002
 Koreshkov 2002
 Talgayev 2003 to 05
 Tarkhanovc 2005 to 06
 Gaisumovc 2006
 V. Shevchenko 2006
 Talgayev 2006 to 07
 Nazarenko 2008

Notable players
Had international caps for their respective countries. Players whose names are listed in bold represented their countries while playing for Akhmat or Terek.

Russia

Other former USSR countries

Europe

Africa

Asia
  Luke Wilkshire
  Milad Mohammadi

South and Central America
  Juan Carlos Arce
  Ewerthon
  Wilker Ángel
  Andrés Ponce

References

External links

Official website 

 
Association football clubs established in 1958
Akhmat Grozny
Akhmat Grozny
1958 establishments in Russia